Robert Joseph Thomas Reis (January 2, 1909 – May 1, 1973), was a professional baseball player who played pitcher and outfield from 1931 to 1938 with the Brooklyn Robins/Dodgers and Boston Bees. He also played for the Saint Paul Saints in Minnesota. 

Born in Woodside, New York, Reis died  in St. Paul, Minnesota on May 1, 1973, aged 64. He was buried in Willow River Cemetery in Hudson, Wisconsin.

References

External links

1909 births
1973 deaths
Major League Baseball outfielders
Major League Baseball pitchers
Brooklyn Robins players
Brooklyn Dodgers players
Boston Bees players
Baseball players from New York (state)
Hartford Senators players
Jersey City Skeeters players
Toledo Mud Hens players
St. Paul Saints (AA) players
People from Woodside, Queens